This is a list of museums in Burkina Faso.

List 

 Manéga Bendrologie Museum
 Music Museum
 National Museum
 Houet Privincial Museum
 Poni Provincial Museum
 Warba Museum

See also 
 List of museums

External links 
 Museums in Burkina Faso

 
Burkina Faso
Museums
Museums
Museums
Burkina Faso